Victor George Roberts (6 August 1924 – 14 March 2004) was an English rugby union player.

Biography 
Vic Roberts was capped 16 times for the England national rugby union team between 1947 and 1956. He was also captain of the Roses XV in 1951. He was part of the British Lions in 1950 against Australia and New Zealand. He was later vice-president and co-selector for the Lions.

At club level, Roberts played for Penryn and Harlequins before transferring to Swansea when his job in Customs and Excise took him to the town. He also played for invitational touring side the Barbarians and later became their vice-president.

References

1924 births
2004 deaths
English rugby union players
Swansea RFC players
British & Irish Lions rugby union players from England
England international rugby union players
Harlequin F.C. players
Barbarian F.C. players
Rugby union flankers
People from Penryn, Cornwall
Cornish rugby union players
Rugby union players from Cornwall